"I Want You" is a song recorded by American singer-songwriter Bob Dylan. Recorded in the early morning hours of March 10, 1966, the song was the last one recorded for Dylan's double-album Blonde on Blonde (1966). It was issued as a single that June, shortly before the release of the album.

There were three complete takes of "I Want You", with the final take and a guitar overdub comprising the master.  The recording session was released in its entirety on the 18-disc Collector's Edition of The Bootleg Series Vol. 12: The Cutting Edge 1965–1966 in 2015, with the penultimate take of the song also appearing on the 6-disc and 2-disc versions of that album.

Dylan performed "I Want You" as a slow ballad during his 1978 world tour, as heard on Bob Dylan at Budokan, released in 1979. Dylan also revisited the song in 1987 on a co-tour with the Grateful Dead; their version was released in 1989 on the Dylan and the Dead album.

The single's B-side was a live version of "Just Like Tom Thumb's Blues" recorded in Liverpool, England at the Odeon Theatre on May 14, 1966.  (This was the first released recording of Dylan live with the Hawks, later the Band.)

Background and recording
"I Want You" was recorded in the early morning hours of March 10, 1966. It was the last song recorded for Dylan's double-album Blonde on Blonde.  It was issued as a single that June, shortly before the release of the album.

There were three complete takes of "I Want You", with the final take and a guitar overdub comprising the master.  The recording session was released in its entirety on the 18-disc Collector's Edition of The Bootleg Series Vol. 12: The Cutting Edge 1965–1966 in 2015, with the penultimate take of the song also appearing on the 6-disc and 2-disc versions of that album.

Sean Wilentz sees numerous failures documented in early drafts for the lyrics; "deputies asking him his name... lines about fathers going down hugging one another and about their daughters putting him down because he isn't their brother". Finally Dylan arrives at the right formula. The song's sentimental aspect was partially explained in a 1966 interview: "It's not just pretty words to a tune or putting tunes to words... [It's] the words and the music [together]—I can hear the sound of what I want to say."

Andy Gill observed that the song's tension is achieved through the balance of the "direct address" of the chorus, the repeated phrase "I want you," and a weird cast of characters "too numerous to inhabit the song's three minutes comfortably", including a guilty undertaker, a lonesome organ grinder, weeping fathers, mothers, sleeping saviours, the Queen of Spades, and "a dancing child with his Chinese suit". Gill reports that "the dancing child" has been interpreted as a reference to Brian Jones of The Rolling Stones, and his then girlfriend Anita Pallenberg. Clinton Heylin agrees there may be substance to this because the dancing child claims that "time was on his side", as a reference to "Time Is On My Side", the Stones' first U.S. hit.

Release and reception
"I Want You" was released as a single on June 13, 1966, with a live version of "Just Like Tom Thumb's Blues recorded in Liverpool on May 14, 1966 as the B-side. Blonde on Blonde, Dylan's seventh studio album, was issued as a double album on June 20, with "I Want You" as the first track on side two. The album version had a duration of three minutes and eight seconds.

The reviewer for Cash Box described the song as a "medium-paced, blues-soaked plea for romance with an infectious, repeating rhythmic riff" that it considered a "sure-fire blockbuster candidate."

Live performances
Dylan first performed "I Want You" live in concert in 1973, accompanied by Neil Young and members of the Band, at a benefit concert for Students Need Athletic and Cultural Kicks (SNACK). Three years later, he performed it during the Rolling Thunder Revue, in a manner that journalist Oliver Trager called a "painful dirge." During his 1978 World Tour Dylan performed "I Want You" as a torch song, while in 1981 it appeared in his live performances in a more uptempo version. After this, he next performed it during the Bob Dylan and the Grateful Dead 1987 Tour, with it remaining part of his live repertoire for the 1987 Temples in Flames Tour.

Personnel
Musicians
Bob Dylanvocals, acoustic guitar, harmonica
Charlie McCoyacoustic guitar
Wayne Mosselectric guitar
Al Kooperorgan
Hargus "Pig" Robbinspiano
Either Henry Strzelecki or Joe Southelectric bass
Kenneth Buttreydrums

Technical
Bob Johnston – record producer

Chart performance
Billboard magazine recorded the release of "I Want You" in its June 25 issue, and predicted it would reach the Top 20. The track entered the Billboard Hot 100 charts on July 2, 1966, at #90, and Billboard tapped the single as a "star performer"—a side "registering greatest proportionate upward progress this week". It peaked at #20 on July 30.

"I Want You" entered the Cash Box charts at #59 on July 2, and was tapped for strong upward movement. It rose slowly, and peaked at #25 on August 6. It was also a major hit in the UK, where it peaked at #16.

Sophie B. Hawkins version

American singer-songwriter Sophie B. Hawkins recorded "I Want You" for her 1992 debut album, Tongues and Tails, at the suggestion of her producer, Rick Chertoff. As the album's third single, it reached No. 49 on the UK Singles Chart in February 1993. The music video, which was shot in Paris, was directed by Lydie Caller and produced by Odille DeVars.

Hawkins' interpretation of "I Want You" saw her change the song's key and slow down its tempo. Hawkins has said of Dylan's lyrics, "Each time I sing [the] song I struggle to grasp what the words are saying." She elaborated, "I completely feel the song, but I don't understand it."

Dylan liked Hawkins' version and she was invited by his manager to perform the song at Dylan's 30th Anniversary Concert Celebration at Madison Square Garden, New York City, in October 1992. Hawkins' performance was one of a number of omissions from the 1993 double-album and VHS releases of the concert.

Larry Flick, writing for Billboard, praised Hawkins' version for being "deliver[ed] with chatty finesse, amid a cushiony synth arrangement". Randy Clark, reviewing for Cash Box, noted that despite Dylan's "obvious lyrical/poetic style", Hawkins' "sultry performance style permeates the recording". Music & Media felt Hawkins "manages to completely transform the Bob Dylan classic" and noted it "sounds like Cyndi Lauper in a Sinéad O'Connor setting".

Charts

Other versions

The Hollies covered the song for their album Hollies Sing Dylan (1969)
Ralph McTell did a slower, piano-based version on his album Water of Dreams

Footnotes

Sources

Books

Radio documentary

External links
 Lyrics at Bon Dylan's official website.

Songs written by Bob Dylan
Bob Dylan songs
Grateful Dead songs
1966 singles
Song recordings produced by Bob Johnston
Columbia Records singles
1966 songs